The following is the 1953–54 network television schedule for the four major English language commercial broadcast networks in the United States. The schedule covers primetime hours from September 1953 through March 1954. The schedule is followed by a list per network of returning series, new series, and series cancelled after the 1952–53 season.

Despite hit filmed programs such as I Love Lucy, both William S. Paley of CBS and David Sarnoff of NBC were said to be determined to keep most programming on their networks live. Filmed programs were said to be inferior to the spontaneous nature of live television. Thus, NBC and CBS continued to schedule many live programs, including two new 1953 fall NBC series The Dave Garroway Show and Bonino. According to Brooks and Marsh (2007), Garroway's show "was faced with overwhelming competition from Mama and Ozzie & Harriet, which were running opposite on CBS and ABC, and it only lasted a single season". Bonino did not even last the full season. CBS had more luck with new live programs Person to Person and My Favorite Husband (which would later make the switch to film).
 
ABC, perennially in third or fourth place among the four U.S. television networks, had been on the verge of bankruptcy, but the February 1953 merger of United Paramount Theaters with ABC had given ABC a $30 million cash infusion. ABC revamped its schedule for Fall 1953 with big-budget programs. New ABC programs included Make Room for Daddy, and an ABC version of NBC's popular Kraft Television Theatre; the strategy was designed to "take on CBS and NBC with a strong schedule".

In contrast to ABC's revamped schedule, DuMont's Fall 1953 prime time schedule looked weak, with programs that were "doomed from the start by third-rate scripts and cheap production." The 1953–54 season would be the last year DuMont was able to schedule nearly 20 hours of programming in prime time. By the 1954–55 season, DuMont would be forced to cut back its schedule, while the other three networks continued to expand.

During the 1953 season, both DuMont and ABC "made sporadic efforts to compete for the daytime audience, but faced so many problems just filling prime time that they found it much more efficient to focus primarily on weekend sports". DuMont paid $1.3 million in 1953 for the rights to broadcast National Football League games in prime time; starting December 12, DuMont also broadcast a series of NBA basketball games, the first time pro basketball was seen regularly on network TV. Both DuMont and ABC "were especially aggressive in pursuit of sports broadcasts because they were desperately in need of special attractions to bring in viewers".

Each of the 30 highest-rated shows is listed with its rank and rating as determined by Nielsen Media Research.

 Yellow indicates the programs in the top 10 for the season.
 Cyan indicates the programs in the top 20 for the season.
 Magenta indicates the programs in the top 30 for the season.

Sunday 

On CBS, The Jack Benny Program alternated with Private Secretary every third week. As of February 14, 1954, Letter to Loretta on NBC became The Loretta Young Show.
On April 18, 1954, The Martha Wright Show replaced The Jane Pickens Show, starring vocalist Jane Pickens Langley, at the 9:15 p.m. time slot on Sundays on ABC. Pickens had previously replaced The Orchid Award.

Monday 

On April 26, 1954, The Tony Martin Show replaced The Arthur Murray Party on NBC. Both programs were fifteen minutes in length.
From April 6, 1953, to December 7, 1953, DuMont aired Monodrama Theater Monday through Friday at 11pm ET.

Tuesday 

(*) Formerly Texaco Star Theater

 On ABC, The United States Steel Hour alternated with The Motorola Television Hour

Wednesday

Thursday

Friday

Saturday

By network

ABC

Returning Series
The Adventures of Ozzie and Harriet
The Big Picture
Billy Graham's Hour of Decision
Cavalcade of America (moved from NBC)
The Dotty Mack Show (moved from DuMont)
Fight Talk
Inspector Mark Saber — Homicide Squad
Junior Press Conference
Leave It to the Girls
The Lone Ranger
Madison Square Garden Highlights
Music at Meadowbrook
The Name's the Same
The Orchid Award
Quick As a Flash
Paul Whiteman's TV Teen Club
The Saturday Night Fights
Sky King
The Stu Erwin Show
Talent Patrol
This Is the Life
The Walter Winchell Show
Wrestling From Rainbo Arena
You Asked For It

New Series
The Adventures of Ozzie and Harriet
Answers for Americans
At Issue
Back That Fact
The Big Picture
Center Stage *
The Comeback Story
Dr. I.Q.
The Ern Westmore Hollywood Glamour Show
The Frank Leahy Show
The George Jessel Show
Jamie
John Daly and the News
 Jukebox Jury
Kraft Television Theatre
Leave It to the Girls
Make Room for Daddy
The Martha Wright Show
The Motorola Television Hour
Notre Dame Football
Of Many Things
On Your Way
The Pepsi-Cola Playhouse
The Pride of the Family
Quick as a Flash
Showcase Theater
Talent Patrol
The Trouble With Father
Through the Curtain
The United States Steel Hour
Where's Raymond?

Not returning from 1952–53:
The Adventures of Ellery Queen
All-Star News
America in View
Anywhere U.S.A.
Back That Fact
The Beulah Show
Both Sides
Fear and Fancy
Feature Playhouse
Hollywood Screen Test
Live Like a Millionaire
On Guard
Perspectives
Plymouth Playhouse
Tales of Tomorrow
This is the Life Presents "The Fisher Family"
United or Not?

CBS

Returning Series
Arthur Godfrey and His Friends
Arthur Godfrey's Talent Scouts
Beat the Clock
Big Town
The Blue Angel
Danger
Douglas Edwards and the News
Four Star Playhouse
The Fred Waring Show
The Garry Moore Show
The Gene Autry Show
General Electric Theater
The George Burns and Gracie Allen Show
I Love Lucy
I've Got a Secret
The Jack Benny Show
The Jackie Gleason Show
The Jane Froman Show
Jane Froman's U.S.A. Canteen
Lux Video Theatre
Mama
Medallion Theatre
Meet Millie
My Friend Irma
Omnibus
Our Miss Brooks
Pabst Blue Ribbon Bouts
The Perry Como Show
Place the Face
The Red Buttons Show
The Red Skelton Show (moved from NBC)
The Revlon Mirror Theater (moved from NBC)
Schlitz Playhouse of Stars
See It Now
Sports Spot
Strike It Rich
Studio One
Suspense
This Is Show Business
Toast of the Town
Topper
Two for the Money
The Web
What in the World?
What's My Line
Your Play Time

New Series
The Blue Angel *
The Jo Stafford Show *
Life with Father
The Man Behind the Badge
Meet Mr. McNutley
My Favorite Husband
Pentagon U.S.A.
Person to Person
The Public Defender
The Telltale Clue *
That's My Boy *

Not returning from 1952–53:
Amos 'n' Andy
Balance Your Budget
Battle of the Ages
Biff Baker, U.S.A.
City Hospital
Crime Syndicated
Footlights Theater
Heaven for Betsy
Jane Froman's U.S.A. Canteen
The Larry Storch Show
Leave It to Larry
Life with Luigi
Mr. and Mrs. North
Racket Squad
Willys Theatre Presenting Ben Hecht's Tales of the City
Your Jeweler's Showcase

DuMont

Returning series
Boxing from Eastern Parkway
Broadway to Hollywood – Headline Clues
Captain Video
Chance of a Lifetime
Concert Tonight
Down You Go
Front Page Detective
Guide Right
The Johns Hopkins Science Review
Life Begins at Eighty
Life is Worth Living
Man Against Crime (moved from CBS)
The Music Show
Pantomime Quiz
The Plainclothesman
Pro Football Highlights
Rocky King, Inside Detective
The Strawhatters
They Stand Accused
Twenty Questions
Washington Exclusive
What's the Story?
What's Your Bid?

New series
Better Living TV theatre *
The Big Issue
Colonel Humphrey Flack
Concert Tonight *
Dollar a Second
Gamble on Love *
The Igor Cassini Show
Joseph Schildkraut Presents
Love Story *
Marge and Jeff
Melody Street
National Football League Professional Football
Night Editor *
Nine Thirty Curtain
On Your Way
Opera Cameos
Pulse of the City
Stars on Parade
The Stranger

Not returning from 1952–53:
The Arthur Murray Party
Author Meets the Critics
The Big Idea
Blind Date
Charlie Wild, Private Detective
Dark of Night
Drama at Eight
Football Sidelines
Georgetown University Forum
Guide Right
Jimmy Hughes, Rookie Cop
Keep Posted
The Old American Barn Dance
One Woman's Experience
The Pet Shop
The Power of Women
Report Card for Parents
Stage a Number
Steve Randall
This Is the Life Presents "The Fisher Family"
Trash or Treasure
Where Was I?
Wisdom of the Ages
Wrestling From Marigold
Youth on the March

NBC

Returning Series
Armstrong Circle Theatre
The Arthur Murray Party
Bank on the Stars (moved from CBS)
The Big Story
The Buick-Berle Show
Camel News Caravan
Cameo Theatre
Campbell Soundstage
Coke Time with Eddie Fisher
The Colgate Comedy Hour
The Dave Garroway Show
The Dennis Day Show
The Dinah Shore Show
Dragnet
Ethel and Albert
Fireside Theatre
Ford Theatre
Gillette Cavalcade of Sports
Goodyear Television Playhouse
Greatest Fights of the Century
I Married Joan
It Happened In Sports
The Kate Smith Evening Hour
Kraft Television Theatre
The Life of Riley
Man Against Crime (moved from CBS)
Martin Kane, Private Eye
Mister Peepers
My Little Margie
Name That Tune
On the Line with Considine
The Original Amateur Hour
The Paul Winchell Show
The Philco Television Playhouse
Robert Montgomery Presents
Texaco Star Theater
This Is Your Life
Treasury Men in Action
The Voice of Firestone
Watch Mr. Wizard
Who Said That?
You Bet Your Life
Your Favorite Story
Your Hit Parade
Your Show of Shows

New Series
The Best in Mystery *
The Bob Hope Show
Bonino
Cheer Television Theatre *
The Dave Garroway Show
The Dennis Day Show
Inner Sanctum
It Happened in Sports
Judge for Yourself
Letter to Loretta
Man Against Crime
The Marriage *
The Martha Raye Show
The Spike Jones Show *
The World of Mr. Sweeney

Not returning from 1952–53:
The Aldrich Family
The Buick Circus Hour
The Doctor
Embassy Club
Eye Witness
Ford Festival
Gang Busters
Gulf Playhouse
The Herman Hickmann Show
My Hero
My Son Jeep
The RCA Victor Show Starring Dennis Day
Scott Music Hall
Short Short Dramas
Those Two
Victory at Sea

Note: The * indicates that the program was introduced in midseason.

References
 McNeil, Alex. (1996). Total Television: The Comprehensive Guide to Programming from 1948 to the Present. Fourth edition. New York: Penguin Books. .
 Brooks, Tim & Marsh, Earle (1984). The Complete Directory to Prime Time Network TV Shows (3rd ed.). New York: Ballantine. .
 Heldenfels, R(ichard) D. (1994). Television's Greatest Year: 1954. New York: Continuum. .

General references
 McNeil, Alex. Total Television. Fourth edition. New York: Penguin Books. .
 Brooks, Tim & Marsh, Earle (2007). The Complete Directory to Prime Time Network and Cable TV Shows (9th ed.). New York: Ballantine. .

Inline citations

United States primetime network television schedules
United States network television schedule
United States network television schedule